From Dusk Till Dawn 2: Texas Blood Money is an American Western horror film released on March 16, 1999. It is the second film in the From Dusk Till Dawn series and is a sequel to From Dusk till Dawn. The film was an early test release by Dimension Films for the direct-to-video market. It was co-written and directed by Scott Spiegel. Michael S. Murphey, Gianni Nunnari, and Meir Teper produced.  Quentin Tarantino and Lawrence Bender executive produced, and Elizabeth Avellan co-produced. The film was filmed on location in South Africa and features cameos by Bruce Campbell and Tiffani Thiessen. It won a Saturn Award from The Academy of Science Fiction Fantasy & Horror Films for the "Best Home Video Release" of 1999.

A third film in the series, From Dusk Till Dawn 3: The Hangman's Daughter, which is a prequel to From Dusk Till Dawn, was released in 2000. In late 2010, a possible fourth film in the series was in production, but no progress was made after its initial stage. In late 2013, a TV series began a production. The show first premiered in 2014 and finished its third season in 2016. James Parks would also later reprise his role as Edgar McGraw in Kill Bill: Volume 1, Kill Bill: Volume 2, Grindhouse (within Death Proof) and Machete; despite having the same actor and character, those films are not related to each other and the character is considered to be an Easter Egg.

Plot 

After escaping from prison, bank robber Luther Heggs (Duane Whitaker) is the subject of a manhunt led by Texas Ranger Otis Lawson. Luther contacts his reformed former accomplice Buck Bowers (Robert Patrick) and tells him to get their old gang back together. Buck starts rounding up the old team, which consists of C.W. Niles (Muse Watson), Jesus Draven (Raymond Cruz), and Ray Bob (Brett Harrelson).

The team arrive at the motel, where they wait for Luther. Whilst on his way in his car, Luther hits a bat resulting in his car breaking down. When the car won't start, Luther walks to a nearby bar, the Titty Twister. He calls Buck from the bar to tell him about the breakdown. Luther in the meantime is offered a ride to the El Coyote by the bartender, Razor Eddie (Danny Trejo). However, when Razor discovers that Luther hit and then tried to kill a bat that was actually his friend Victor (Joe Virzi), he drives him back to his car, where Victor and Razor attack and turn Luther into a vampire.

Back at the motel, Jesus has sex with Lupe (Maria Checa), a woman he bumped into when he arrived at the motel. After they finish, Jesus sleeps while Lupe grabs a shower. Luther arrives in bat form and kills Lupe. Jesus awakes and starts to get dressed. The shower turns off, and he notices blood seeping from underneath the door of the bathroom. He goes to investigate and sees the body of Lupe lying lifeless in the bath. Luther then attacks Jesus before he hides in the bathroom. Lupe then reanimates as a vampire and attacks Jesus. He manages to kill Lupe by cutting her head off and then jumps out of the window in order to escape.

Luther catches up with Jesus, transforming him into a vampire. Hearing the noise, the owner of the motel goes to investigate and sees Luther killing Jesus. She panics and runs to the office and tries to call the police but is attacked and killed by Luther. While Buck is still in the room watching porn, somebody tries to get in through the locked door. Realizing it is Jesus, Buck opens the door where they find out that Luther has arrived. They then plan the heist which involves the robbery of the Banco Bravos bank.

The gang drive off to the bank, with Jesus and Luther covering the windows with black paper. Unbeknownst to the gang, this is to allow Jesus and Luther to have a place to escape to when the sun rises. Back at the Motel, after receiving the call from the Motel manager, Otis observes the crime scene. Upon arriving at the bank, Luther enters the building through the vents and proceeds to kill the security guard on duty and snatches the keys to let the others in.

Luther and C.W. proceed to the safe where they begin cracking it open. As they try to open the safe, they notice that the handle on the vault resembles a cross causing Luther to squeal before quickly covering it. While working with C.W. closely, Luther gets tempted to bite C.W.'s neck. C.W., feeling uncomfortable due to Luther's proximity tells him to back off, before removing Luther's coat from the handle. Luther reacts again and bites C.W, turning him into a vampire.

The authorities arrive at the bank. Buck encourages the others to escape, but they refuse. Buck and Ray Bob leave the bank but are forced back in by the police and SWAT team. With the bank surrounded by cops and no escape in sight, Otis arrives and calls the bank. Otis asks to speak to the guard. With the guard dead, Buck tells Jesus to pretend to be the guard and tell Otis in Spanish that he is fine.

Otis then tells the SWAT team to enter the bank via the roof. Jesus rips the phone out of Buck's hand and tears it from the wall. Luther and C.W. unlock the vaults, before filling the bags with $1 million in cash. The SWAT team on the roof throw tear gas down the vent. Luther throws it back up to them before killing them in bat form. Luther returns and bites Ray Bob, turning him into a vampire as well. Back in the guard's room, Buck and Jesus are still waiting. Buck lights a cigarette and notices that Jesus has no reflection in the computer screen.

Luther then enters telling the two to help load the money. Buck holds a gun to Luther, Jesus and C.W. and tells Ray Bob to stand by his side. Ray Bob reveals that he too is now a vampire. The group attacks Buck but he escapes the bank and gets arrested by Otis. Otis sends in the SWAT team to clear out the bank, despite Buck's warning. The group of vampires brutally kills and feed on the SWAT Team.

Suddenly, sunlight appears, and the vampires try to hide. However, an eclipse takes place and the Sun disappears. The vampire leave the bank and starts to kill the officers and SWAT Teams in a full blown blood bath. Once all the cops have been killed, only Buck, Otis, and the Sheriff remain. A face-off between the survivors and the vampires takes place. Just as all of the vampires appear to be defeated, a female police officer, who has been turned, attacks the survivors and succeeds in freeing the vampires. Buck kills the female vampire, just as Jesus kills the sheriff.

Jesus then attempts to take the money for himself before being caught by Luther. C.W. is then killed by Otis while Jesus is killed by Buck after being impaled by a horned hood ornament. Luther attacks Otis, as Ray Bob attacks Buck. Seeing that the eclipse is ending, Luther and Ray Bob try to escape to their car. Luther is killed by Buck, who had been hiding in the back seat. Ray Bob mistimes his retreat and the eclipse ends, revealing the Sun. Buck uses his sunglasses to reflect sunlight onto Ray Bob, killing him. Otis and Buck reunite and take in the events that have just occurred. As sirens are heard approaching, Buck flees with Otis giving him a head start.

Cast

Release 
From Dusk Till Dawn 2 was originally released direct-to-video on March 16, 1999.

Echo Bridge Entertainment released it on Blu-ray on May 15, 2011.

Reception 
Rotten Tomatoes, a review aggregator, reports that 9% of 11 surveyed critics gave the film a positive review; the average rating was 2.7/10. Bilge Ebiri of Entertainment Weekly rated it D- and wrote: "Without the genre-bending goofiness and engaging characters of the first Dusk, all that's left is cheap splatter effects and cliched Western/horror homages". Nathan Rabin of The A.V. Club called it "a gigantic waste of everyone's time, money, and energy". Youssef Kdiry of DVD Talk rated the film 4/5 stars.  Jim Thomas of DVD Verdict called the film "half-baked" and "disappointing", even for a direct-to-video release.

See also 
 Vampire film

References

External links 
 
 
 
 

1999 direct-to-video films
1999 horror films
1999 films
1990s crime films
1990s Western (genre) horror films
American direct-to-video films
American action horror films
American crime films
American supernatural horror films
A Band Apart films
Buena Vista Home Entertainment direct-to-video films
Dimension Films films
Direct-to-video horror films
Direct-to-video sequel films
Films about the Texas Ranger Division
Films directed by Scott Spiegel
Films produced by Elizabeth Avellán
Films produced by Robert Rodriguez
Films set in Mexico
Films set in Texas
Films with screenplays by Boaz Yakin
From Dusk till Dawn (franchise)
Supernatural action films
Troublemaker Studios films
American vampire films
1990s English-language films
1990s American films